Jacques Nienaber (born 16 October 1972) is a South African rugby union coach who is currently the head coach of the South Africa national team, the Springboks.

Early life
Nienaber was born in Kimberley, but grew up in Bloemfontein, where he attended Grey College. He played rugby at centre for the 1sts.

He attended the University of the Free State, where he first began to work in partnership with Rassie Erasmus.

Rugby Coaching career

1997–2007: Free State Cheetahs/Cats/Cheetahs

When the Free State Cheetahs were formally included as part of the  Super 12 franchise for the 1998 season, Nienaber also held the same role for them.

In 2004, he also took over the role of Strength and Conditioning Coach at the Free State Cheetahs. He remained in that role when former South African national team flanker Rassie Erasmus took over as head coach in 2005, in a season that saw the team win the domestic Currie Cup trophy for only the second time in their history.

2008–2015: Western Province/Stormers/South African Rugby Union

After missing out on the play-offs in 2008 and 2009, an improvement in defence – which saw Western Province end the 2009 Currie Cup season with the fewest points conceded – also led to an improvement of the Stormers' fortunes. Nienaber's record as a defence coach was noted by the South African national team, and was approached to join their staff, but the move was blocked by his existing employers.

The Stormers again reached the play-offs in 2011 with the second best defensive record, and Western Province had the best defensive record in the 2011 Currie Cup. He was once again approached by the national team, and he was included in their coaching staff for the 2011 Rugby World Cup.

He returned to domestic coaching with the Stormers and Western Province for 2012, as both teams again had the best defensive records in their respective competitions, with the Stormers reaching the semi-finals of the Super Rugby competition, while Nienaber tasted his first success with Western Province, as the team won the 2012 Currie Cup.

The Stormers missed out on the 2013 Super Rugby play-offs despite having the best defensive record, while Western Province reached the 2013 Currie Cup final, which they lost to the Sharks. The Stormers endured a very poor season in 2014, finishing 11th, but Western Province won the 2014 Currie Cup final, their second during Nienaber's time at the team. At the end of 2014, they agreed to release him from his contract to join the SARU coaching staff on a full-time basis.

2016–2017: Munster

In April 2016, Rassie Erasmus was appointed as the Director of Rugby of Munster on a three-year contract, and Nienaber followed Erasmus, joining the Irish Pro12 side as a defence coach on a three-year contract.

2018–2019: Springboks 
When Rassie Erasmus accepted the position of Director of Rugby for SA Rugby, he made sure that his lieutenant Nienaber would have a role to play in the South African national set-up. Erasmus was subsequently called upon in 2018 to steady the ship as the Springboks endured a poor run of form under coach Allister Coetzee, but he always made it clear that he was not interested in the job long-term.

2020–present: Springboks 
In January 2020, Nienaber was announced as the new head coach of the Springboks and handed the keys to a World Champion squad. Unusually, Nienaber had no experience as a head coach at the time. He would have to wait a full year due to the Covid-19 pandemic before finally fielding his first team against Georgia on 2 July 2021 ahead of the 2021 British and Irish Lions series. The Springboks ended up winning the renowned series against the Lions 2–1, coming from behind after very narrowly losing the first test in Cape Town.

Record by Country

References

External links
Munster Rugby Staff Profile

1972 births
Living people
Afrikaner people
South African rugby union coaches
University of the Free State alumni
Munster Rugby non-playing staff
Sportspeople from Bloemfontein